Quercus perpallida is a species of plant in the family Fagaceae. It is endemic to Mexico. It is placed in section Quercus.

References

Flora of the Sierra Madre Occidental
perpallida
Data deficient plants
Taxonomy articles created by Polbot
Endemic oaks of Mexico
Taxa named by William Trelease